The Bomba, also spelled Bambas, are a tribe found in the Pakistani-controlled territory of Azad Jammu and Kashmir and the Indian union territory of Jammu and Kashmir. In Azad Kashmir, they are primarily found in Muzaffarabad and Neelum districts, with a large number concentrated in and around the town of Ghori. Outside of Azad Kashmir, they are also found in the Boi and Kaghan valleys of Mansehra District, and the city of Abbottabad—all located in Khyber Pakhtunkhwa. In Jammu and Kashmir, they are found in the Poonch and Rajouri districts of Jammu division.

History and origin 
The Bomba clan claim descent were from Arab Tribes whom they claim inhabited the tracts of the Karnah/Karnav region. The rajas of the Bomba clan ruled Karnah till the Sikh conquest of Kashmir. The Karnav Bombas and their supporters, the Khakha chiefs of Vitasta valley, were invaded in 1846.

The Bombas/Bambas style themselves  'sultan. Others state that they are of indigenous hill Rajput descent who converted to Islam from Hinduism. In the past Bombas ruled the Jhelum Valley and had a close alliance and kinship with the Khakha Rajputs who inhabited the same area. The success of this alliance earned them a warlike and refractory reputation, as they jointly fought the early Mughal rule of Akbar and later resisted the Sikhs.

Sultan Muzaffar Khan Bomba established the city of Muzaffarabad in present-day Azad Kashmir. Sultan Sher Ahmed Khan Bomba was the last Bomba ruler, defeated by the Dogra ruler Maharaja Rambir Singh at Panzgam, Kupwara (Keran-Karnah) in the current Indian Kashmir in the early 19th century. The Kupwara Keran Bomba tribe consisted of prominent heads like Sofi Khan-Sheermar Khan, Feroz Khan, Zabardast Khan and Zakeria Khan. Before the partition of Jammu & Kashmir the state was ruled by Bombas in many parts of the state like Khori, Majhoi and Lawasi.

Bombas of Hazara Division 
The Bomba are found in smaller numbers in the Boi tract of the Mansehra District also in mansehra city of the Hazara Division of the North West Frontier Province/Khyber-Pakhtunkhwa. They are represented by three main families, one of Boi, Tarheri and the other of Jabri Kalesh. The Boi and Tarheri  family is an important one in this region.

Descendant of Sultans 
The descendants of Sultans of Kashmir live in different area of world but the famous grand grand son "Khan of Jabri", "Khan of Tarheri" (Raja Huwaris Usmani), "Khan of Kashmir" (Raza Khan) who is also the Justice of Supreme Court Kashmir.

Some of the great names belonging to the family are: Sultan Matwali khan (jageerdar Kathai), Sultan Hassan Ali Khan (jageerdar Boe and the member of parliament of joint India on the seat of landlord), Sultan Qutub-ud-din Khan (jageerdar Lawasi), Sultan Feroz din Khan (son of jageerdar Lawasi), Raja Muhammad Hussain Khan (son of jageerdar Lawasi and son-in-law of jageerdar Boe), Raja Muhammad Nasir Khan (son of jageerdar Lawasi and secretary to Maharaja kashmir), Muhammad Muzaffar Khan (first Muslim judge in Kashmir), Khalid Muzaffar Khan(son of Muhammad Muzaffar Khan), Raja Nassar ud din khan (son-in-law of Muhammad Muzaffar Khan), Zafar Umar khan(Son of Feroz din Khan sahib), his cousin brother Raja Tanveer Hussain Khan(Son of Muhammad Hussain Khan sahib) and many more. Zafar Umar Khan son of Feroze Khan had three daughter and two sons. Former Member of Public Service Commission, Samia Fayyaz Raja is his daughter.

See also

[[Khakha
Ethnic groups of Azad Kashmir

References

Books

External links
OPF Almanac
VILLAGES OF HISTORICAL IMPORTANCE - Official website of Kupwara District (India)

Social groups of Azad Kashmir
Social groups of Jammu and Kashmir
Hindkowan tribes